Gloria Pasqua-Casny is a hairstylist. Along with makeup artist Joel Harlow, she was nominated for Academy Award for Best Makeup and Hairstyling for the 2013 film The Lone Ranger at the 86th Academy Awards.

References

External links
 

Living people
Place of birth missing (living people)
Hairdressers
Emmy Award winners
1952 births